Sternocera funebris is a species of beetles belonging to the Buprestidae family.

Distribution
This species can be found in Zimbabwe.

References

Buprestidae
Beetles described in 1860